Borja Rubiato Martínez (born 13 November 1984 in Madrid) is a Spanish professional footballer who plays for Real Ávila CF as a striker.

Club statistics

References

External links

HKFA profile

1984 births
Living people
Footballers from Madrid
Spanish footballers
Association football forwards
Segunda División players
Segunda División B players
Tercera División players
Las Rozas CF players
CA Osasuna B players
Getafe CF B players
CD Cobeña players
Atlético Madrid B players
Cádiz CF players
SD Huesca footballers
Real Oviedo players
Zamora CF footballers
RSD Alcalá players
Marbella FC players
CF Trival Valderas players
CD Olímpic de Xàtiva footballers
CD Mensajero players
CD Ebro players
Arandina CF players
Real Ávila CF players
North American Soccer League players
San Antonio Scorpions players
Iraqi Premier League players
Erbil SC players
Hong Kong First Division League players
Kitchee SC players
Spanish expatriate footballers
Expatriate soccer players in the United States
Expatriate footballers in Iraq
Expatriate footballers in Hong Kong
Spanish expatriate sportspeople in the United States
Spanish expatriate sportspeople in Iraq
Spanish expatriate sportspeople in Hong Kong